Sulejman bey Delvina, also known as Sylejman Fehmi (5 October 1871 – 1 August 1932), was an Albanian politician and prime minister from March to November 1920.

Biography

Early life 
Sulejman Delvina was born on 5 October 1871 in the city of the same name, Delvinë, then Ottoman Empire. His father Selim bey came from a family of high status in the area which is evidenced by the honorific title Bey that Sulejman himself, his father Selim and his brother Namik held. He studied in the rüşdiye (Middle school) at the Zosimaia School in Ioannina, while completed his university studies at the Mekteb-i Mülkiye for Public Administration in Istanbul, from where he graduated in the class of 1899. In the same year he began to serve as an officer in the Ottoman Ministry of Interior. In May 1901, he became a professor of Ottoman literature at Vefa Idadi school in Istanbul, and from September 1905 onwards he held the same post at the prestigious Galatasaray High School. In 1909, he wrote a manual, republished in 1910 and 1912, on Ottoman literature for the high schools of the empire. In July 1911 he was one of the organizers of the student protest, demanding the right to use the Albanian alphabet that was adopted on 1908 in the Congress of Manastir, but has not been recognized by the Ottoman Empire. In 1916, in addition to being a professor, he resumed work in the Ministry of the Interior until the signing of the Armistice of Mudros.

Return to Albania and Political Career 
In 1919 he was the representative of the Albanian communities of the Ottoman Empire in the Paris Peace Conference. On 30 January 1920, the Congress of Lushnjë decided to overthrow the so-called the Government of Durrës for violating national interests and decided to appoint a new government. Sulejman Delvina was appointed as Prime Minister, taking into account his experience as a former official in the Ottoman Empire.In 1924 Sulejman Delvina was one of the leaders of the revolution that overthrew the regime of Zog I, King of Albania and established a democratic government. Fan S. Noli became the new Prime Minister, while Sulejman Delvina was part of the new cabinet as Minister of Foreign Affairs.

He died on 1 August 1932 in Vlorë.

Notes

References 

1884 births
1932 deaths
People from Delvinë
Albanian Sunni Muslims
Albanian diplomats
Government ministers of Albania
Prime Ministers of Albania
Foreign ministers of Albania
Mekteb-i Mülkiye alumni
Civil servants from the Ottoman Empire
People from Janina vilayet